IFK Kalmar is a football club based in Kalmar, Sweden. The team plays in Sweden's top-division women's league, Damallsvenskan.

IFK Kalmar play their home games at Gröndals IP in Kalmar.

Current squad
.

Former players
For details of former players, see :Category:IFK Kalmar players.

References

External links
  

 
Women's football clubs in Sweden
Damallsvenskan teams
Association football clubs established in 1970
1970 establishments in Sweden
Sport in Kalmar